Makinavaja was a Spanish comedy TV series, adapting Ivà's comic strip of the same name, which aired 39 episodes between 1995 and 1997 on La 2. It was directed by Carlos Suárez Morilla in its first season and José Luis Cuerda on the second. The fiction follows the adventures of Makinavaja (Pepe Rubianes), a thief (chorizo).

Cast
 Pepe Rubianes...Makinavaja.
 Ricard Borràs...Popeye.
 Mario Pardo...Mojamé.
 Pedro Reyes...El Pirata (1995).
 Llàtzer Escarceller...Matías.
 Florinda Chico...La Maru.
 Josep Adell...Comisario MediaOstia.

References

External links
    Interview with Carlos Suárez in El País, 10 January 1995 In Spanish
 Interview with José Luis Cuerda in El Mundo, 23 August 1995 In Spanish

1995 Spanish television series debuts
1997 Spanish television series endings
Television shows based on comics
La 2 (Spanish TV channel) network series
1990s Spanish comedy television series
Spanish crime comedy television series
Television shows based on comic strips